Awazisan Maru (淡路山丸), also known as Awajisan Maru or Awagisan Maru, was a motor cargo vessel built by Tama Zosensho of Tamano for Mitsui & Co. Ltd. with intention of serving on their Yokohama to New York route. The ship remained in service between Japan and United States for two years before being requisitioned by the Imperial Japanese Army. She was bombed and damaged during her first Army mission and subsequently torpedoed and sunk by a Dutch submarine in December 1941.

Design and construction
The ship was launched in 1939 and was notable for being the most advanced freighter of its time. It was commissioned by the Imperial Japanese Army to transport troops in World War II and was part of the Japanese Invasion of Malaya on 8 December 1941.

Operational history

Imperial Japanese Army
Along with its sister ship  and Sakura Maru, she was carrying around 5,000 troops during the landings at Kota Bharu. Awazisan Maru was bombed by a Lockheed Hudson aircraft of No. 1 Squadron RAAF, set afire and was abandoned to drift. It is believed that the freighter sunk or was subsequently torpedoed by the Dutch submarine K XII.

The invasion of Malaya preceded the attack on Pearl Harbor by an hour and a half, making it the first Japanese campaign of World War II, likely making Awazisan Maru the very first casualty in the war.

It is more popularly known amongst local divers as the Japanese Invasion Wreck.

Citations

External links
 The Japanese landings in 1941 on Malaya
 MOL Ships In 120 Years
 Diving The Awazisan Maru
 Ahmad, Sager & Tiong, John. "End Of Western Rule", New Straits Times Press (Malaysia).

1938 ships
Ships built in Japan
World War II merchant ships of Japan
Troop ships of Japan
Maritime incidents in December 1941
World War II shipwrecks in the South China Sea
Ships sunk by Dutch submarines